Albert Bunjaki (born 18 June 1971) is a Kosovan professional football coach and former player who is the current manager of IF Karlstad.

Managerial career

Kosovo
On 18 July 2009, Bunjaki was appointed as the manager of the Kosovo after the former coach Edmond Rugova decided to irrevocable resign in June 2009. On 17 February 2010, he made his first match as Kosovo manager in a 2–3 home defeat against Albania. During his time as coach, Bunjaki called up many new players from clubs from championships of Kosovo as well as internationally.

On 7 October 2017, The Football Federation of Kosovo confirms that Bunjaki after the match against Iceland will no longer be the manager of Kosovo after he decided that decided to resign after weak results during 2018 FIFA World Cup qualifications.

Feronikeli

On 13 November 2019, Bunjaki was appointed as the advisor of the Football Superleague of Kosovo club Feronikeli.

Personal life
Bunjaki was born in Pristina, SFR Yugoslavia by Kosovo Albanian parents from Glogovac. In 1991, after a conscription call from the Yugoslav People's Army, Bunjaki decided to reject the call and leave for Sweden for this action, he was sentenced to 20 years' imprisonment in absentia. Upon arriving in Sweden, he changed his surname from Bunjaku to Bunjaki.

Career statistics

Managerial

References

1971 births
Living people
Sportspeople from Pristina
Kosovo Albanians
Kosovan men's footballers
Swedish men's footballers
Swedish people of Kosovan descent
Swedish people of Albanian descent
Association football forwards
FC Prishtina players
Skövde AIK players
Kosovan football managers
Kosovo national football team managers
Swedish football managers
Degerfors IF managers